Latu Vaʻeno (born circa 1959) is a former Tongan rugby union player. He played as a prop.

Career
His first cap for Tonga was during a match against Fiji, at Apia, on 5 June 1985. He also was part of the 1987 Rugby World Cup, where he only played the pool match against Wales, at Palmerston North, on 29 May 1987, which was also his last match for Tonga.

External links
Latu Vaʻeno international statistics

1959 births
Living people
Tongan rugby union players
Rugby union props
Tonga international rugby union players